Pedro Bigas Rigo (born 15 May 1990) is a Spanish professional footballer who plays as a defender or a midfielder for Elche CF.

Club career

Mallorca
Born in Palma de Mallorca, Balearic Islands, Bigas made his debut as a senior with CD Montuïri in 2009, in Tercera División. On 9 July 2010, he signed for Segunda División B club CD Atlético Baleares.

Bigas joined RCD Mallorca on 20 June 2011, being initially assigned to the reserves also in the third division. He made his first-team – and La Liga – debut on 1 October, starting in a 2–2 away draw against CA Osasuna as a left back.

On 28 August 2012, Bigas renewed his contract until 2015, being definitely promoted to the main squad and given the number 17 jersey. On 22 October he scored his first professional goal, opening the 3–2 loss at Sevilla FC. He was occasionally used as a left-back and defensive midfielder during the season, as his side suffered relegation.

Las Palmas and Eibar
On 13 July 2015, Bigas agreed to a two-year deal at UD Las Palmas, newly promoted to the top flight. He scored a career-best four times in the 2016–17 campaign, in a 14th-place finish.

On 31 July 2018, after being relegated, Bigas was loaned to SD Eibar of the same tier, with a buyout clause. The following May, he joined them permanently.

Elche
On 7 July 2021, Elche CF reached an agreement with Eibar for the transfer of Bigas, who joined the former on a two-year contract.

Career statistics

Club

References

External links
Las Palmas official profile 

1990 births
Living people
Spanish footballers
Footballers from Palma de Mallorca
Association football defenders
Association football midfielders
Association football utility players
La Liga players
Segunda División players
Segunda División B players
Tercera División players
CD Atlético Baleares footballers
RCD Mallorca B players
RCD Mallorca players
UD Las Palmas players
SD Eibar footballers
Elche CF players